Events in the year 1999 in Cyprus.

Incumbents 

 President: Demetris Christofias
 President of the Parliament: Yiannakis Omirou

Events 
Ongoing – Cyprus dispute

 7 April – President Spyros Kyprianou flew to Belgrade to help with the negotiations for the release of the three American soldiers detained by Serbia.

Deaths

References 

 
1990s in Cyprus
Years of the 21st century in Cyprus
Cyprus
Cyprus
Cyprus